Rasha al Ameer is a Lebanese publisher, cultural critic and novelist.

Biography 
Rasha al-Ameer began writing as a student in Paris. After returning to Lebanon in 1990, she and Lebanese writer and translator Lokman Slim founded Dar-al Jadeed, an independent Lebanese publishing house, which has published work by Mohammad Khatami and Mahmoud Darwish, among other authors.

In 2021, her work was distinguished with the Sheikh Zayed Book Award in the category Publishing and Technology.

Works
 Yawm al-din, Beirut: Dar Al-Jadeed, 2002. 
 Translated into French by Youssef Seddik as Le dernier jour: confessions d'un imam, Paris: Actes Sud, 2009.
 Translated into English by Jonathan Wright. Judgment Day: A Modern Arabic Novel, Oxford University Press, 2011.

References

External links
 An excerpt from "Judgment Day" by Rasha al Ameer, Jadaliyya
 Q & A: On Translating Rasha al-Ameer's 'Judgment Day'

Year of birth missing
Living people
Lebanese publishers (people)
Lebanese novelists